Travis Horace Davis (born January 10, 1973, in Wilmington, California) is a former American football safety in the National Football League. He was drafted by the Jacksonville Jaguars in the seventh round of the 1995 NFL Draft. He played college football at Notre Dame.

Davis also played for the Pittsburgh Steelers.

References

1973 births
Living people
Players of American football from Los Angeles
American football safeties
Notre Dame Fighting Irish football players
Jacksonville Jaguars players
Pittsburgh Steelers players
People from Wilmington, Los Angeles